Lux Balmaceda Pascal (born 4 June 1992) is an American-born Chilean actress and transgender activist.

Early and personal life 

Lux was born in California as Lucas Balmaceda to Chilean parents José Balmaceda and Verónica Pascal. Her parents were exiled from Chile after the 1973 coup due to her mother's connection to Andrés Pascal Allende, a leader of the Chilean Revolutionary Left Movement. Lux is the youngest of four siblings, including actor Pedro Pascal. When she was three years old, her family returned to Chile where she attended Saint George's College.

In 2010, Lux began studying theater at the Pontifical Catholic University of Chile. Currently, she is pursuing her MFA in acting at the Juilliard School and is expected to graduate in 2023.

In February 2021, Lux publicly announced that she is a transgender woman and changed her name to reflect her maternal surname. She has been in a relationship with actor José Antonio Raffo since 2011.

Career 
In 2014, during her fourth year of studying theater, Lux made her stage debut in Pablo Rotemberg's play La noche obstinada.  That same year, she landed her first television role on Canal 13's series Los 80, where she played "Axel Miller". In 2015, she co-starred in the TVN soap opera Juana Brava, and the following year, she acted in the soap opera Veinteañero a los 40 on Canal 13. Lux made her film debut in 2016 in Prueba de actitud, directed by Fabrizio Copano and Augusto Matte. 

In 2017, Lux appeared in an international series for the first time, playing the role of Elijah in the third season of the Netflix series Narcos, alongside her brother Pedro.

In 2019, Lux participated in three Chilean film productions: No quiero ser tu hermano, directed by Sebastián Badilla, Ella es Cristina, directed by Gonzalo Maza, and The Prince, directed by Sebastián Muñoz.

Theater 
 2014: La noche obstinada
 2017: Tebas Land
 2019: Kassandra

Filmography

Film
 2011: Baby Shower
 2016: Prueba de actitud
 2019: No quiero ser tu hermano
 2019: Ella es Cristina
 2019: El príncipe

Television
2014: Los 80
2015: Veinteañero a los 40
2015: Juana Brava
2017: Narcos
2017: 12 días que estremecieron Chile
2018: Santiago Paranormal
2019: Héroes invisibles
2020: La jauría

References

External links

1992 births
American transgender actors
American people of Chilean descent
Chilean LGBT actors
Chilean transgender people
Chilean people of Basque descent
Chilean people of Spanish descent
Hispanic and Latino American actresses
Juilliard School alumni
Living people
Pontifical Catholic University of Chile alumni
Transgender actresses
Transgender women